Radial head fractures are a common type of elbow fracture that typically occurs after a fall on an outstretched arm. They account for approximately one third of all elbow fractures and are frequently associated with other injuries of the elbow. Radial head fractures are diagnosed by a clinical assessment and medical imaging. A radial head fracture is treated according to the severity of the injury and its Mason-Johnston classification. Treatment may be surgical or nonsurgical. Stable isolated fractures typically have excellent outcomes. Unstable fractures with other associated injuries have varying outcomes. Common adverse outcomes include stiffness, pain, poor bone healing, and hardware complications.

Diagnosis and classification 
Radial head fractures are diagnosed from a clinical assessment and diagnostic imaging. Clinical assessment may include pain or tenderness at the radial head, bruising, swelling, and a limited range of motion of the injured elbow. Diagnostic imaging may include ultrasound, plain radiography (x-ray imaging), Computed tomography scan (CT), and magnetic resonance imaging (MRI). A fat pad sign may be present on diagnostic imaging and may indicate a radial head fracture.

A diagnosed radial head fracture can be classified according to the Mason-Johnston system.

Treatment 
Radial head fracture treatment is informed by the Mason-Johnston classification, patient symptoms, and fracture stability. An unstable fracture will involve fracture displacement, fractures to adjacent structures and injury to other associated soft tissues. A stable type 1 radial head fracture is typically managed with conservative measures including joint aspiration, immobilization in a sling for a few days and followed by early range of motion exercises. If range of motion is still limited after joint aspiration it may indicate a mechanical block which is treated surgically. Stable type 2 radial head fractures may be treated as a type 1 if the displacement is minimal. Unstable type 2 - 4 fractures generally warrant surgery. Surgical correction can include fracture fragment excision, radial head reconstruction, open reduction and internal fixation, and radial head excision with artificial replacement. Associated structures that were damaged during the injury may also need to be repaired.

Rehabilitation exercises are recommended and tailored to fracture and treatment type. It is recommended to wait 6 weeks before resuming load bearing with a stable type 1 fracture and 10-12 weeks following surgery for unstable type 2-4 fractures.

Prognosis and Complications 
Stable type 1 and 2 radial head fractures often have good outcomes with most cases regaining complete range of motion and having minimal residual stiffness or pain. Outcomes for unstable type 2-4 radial head fractures vary greatly depending on the severity of the injury and the surgical intervention. Some of the more common complications of unstable radial head fractures includes stiffness, poor bone healing, nerve damage, and pain/prominent hardware.

References

External links 

Bone fractures